The Flying Doctors of East Africa is a 1969 documentary film by Werner Herzog about the "flying doctors" service of the African Medical and Research Foundation in Tanzania and Kenya. The film is a fairly conventional documentary made during the filming of Herzog's more stylized films Fata Morgana and Even Dwarfs Started Small.

Herzog was asked to make this film by some friends of the doctors themselves.
The film consists mostly of factual accounts of the doctors' service, mostly avoiding the surrealism and stylizations that characterize the typical Herzog film. Herzog has said, "I do not even call it a film, it is much more a Bericht, a report."

References

External links 
 

1969 films
Documentary films about Africa
Documentary films about health care
Documentary films about aviation
West German films
German short documentary films
1960s short documentary films
1969 short films
1969 documentary films
1960s German films